The Erivan Khanate, also known as Chokhur-e Sa'd, was a khanate (i.e. province) that was established in Afsharid Iran in the 18th century. It covered an area of roughly 19,500 km2, and corresponded to most of present-day central Armenia, the Iğdır Province and the Kars Province's Kağızman district in present-day Turkey and the Sharur and Sadarak districts of the Nakhchivan Autonomous Republic of present-day Azerbaijan.

The provincial capital of Erivan was a center of the Iranian defenses in the Caucasus during the Russo-Iranian Wars of the 19th century. As a result of the Iranian defeat in the last Russo-Iranian War, it was occupied by Russian troops in 1827 and then ceded to the Russian Empire in 1828 in accordance with the Treaty of Turkmenchay. Immediately following this, the territories of the former Erivan Khanate and the neighboring Nakhchivan Khanate were merged to form the Armenian Oblast of the Russian Empire.

History

Administration
During the Iranian rule, the kings (shahs) appointed the various governors to preside over their domains, thus creating an administrative center. These governors usually carried the title of "khan" or "beglarbeg", as well as the title of sardār (“chief”). Prior to the establishment of the khanate (i.e. province), the Iranians had used the Erivan Province (also known as Chokhur-e Sa'd) to govern roughly the same area. Both the Safavid era province, as well as the administrative entity of the Zand and Qajar era, were alternatively known by the name of Chokhur-e Sa'd.

In the Qajar era, members of the royal Qajar dynasty were appointed as governors of the Erivan khanate, until the Russian occupation in 1828. The heads of the provincial government of the Erivan Khanate were thus directly related to the central ruling dynasty. Administratively, the khanate was divided into fifteen administrative districts called maḥals with Persian as its official language. The local bureaucracy was modeled on that of the central government, located in Tehran.

Together with the Nakchivan Khanate, the area made up part of Iranian Armenia (also known as Persian Armenia). The Erivan Khanate made up the bulk of Iranian Armenia. The remaining fringes of historic Armenia under Iranian rule were part of the Karabakh and Ganja Khanates as well as the Kingdom of Kartli-Kakheti.

Events and ceding to Russia
Nader Shah (r. 1736-1747) organized the region into four khanates; Erivan, Nakhchivan, Karabakh, and Ganja. Following his death in 1747, the territory became part of the Zands. After the Zand period, it passed to the Iranian Qajars. During the Qajar period, the khanate was considered to be quite prosperous. After the Russians annexed Kartli-Kakheti and initiated the Russo-Persian War of 1804–1813, Erivan became, "once more", a center of the Iranian defenses in the Caucasus.

In 1804, Russian general Pavel Tsitsianov attacked Erivan, but a "superior" Iranian army, under the command of crown prince Abbas Mirza, repelled the attack. In 1807, the central Iranian government of king Fath-Ali Shah Qajar (r. 1797–1834) appointed Hossein Khan Sardar as the new governor (khan) of Erivan, and made him the commander-in-chief (hence, sardar) of the Iranian forces to the north of the river Aras.

Hossein Khan Sardar was one of the most important individuals in the government of then incumbent king Fath-Ali Shah Qajar. A capable administrator, his long tenure as governor is considered to be an era of prosperity, during which he made the khanate a model province. His local bureaucracy, modeled on that of the central government in Tehran, was efficient, and restored the confidence of the local Armenians in the Iranian rule.

In 1808 the Russians, now led by general Ivan Gudovich, attacked the city once again; this attempt was repelled as well. By the Treaty of Gulistan (1813), which ended the 1804–1813 war, Iran lost most of its Caucasus territories; Erivan and Tabriz were now the main headquarters of the Iranian efforts to regain the territories lost to Russia.

About a decade later, in violation of the Gulistan Treaty, the Russians invaded the Erivan Khanate. This sparked the final bout of hostilities between the two; the Russo-Persian War of 1826–1828. In the early stages of this war, the Iranians were successful in recovering many of the territories that were lost in 1813; however, the Russian offensive of 1827, in which the superior Russian artillery played a decisive role, resulted in the Iranians being defeated at Abbasabad, Sardarabad as well Erivan. Erivan was taken by the Russians on 2 October 1827. In February 1828, Iran was forced to sign the Treaty of Turkmenchay, which resulted in the cession of the khanate (as well as the other remaining territories to the north of the Aras River) to the Russians. After the fall of the Soviet Union, the Aras River became and remained the border between Iran and Armenia.

Provincial capital
Erivan city was reportedly "quite prosperous" in the Qajar era. It covered roughly one square mile, whereas its direct environs (incl. gardens) further extended some eighteen miles. The city itself had, according to Kettenhofen et al. / Encyclopædia Iranica, three mahals, more than 1,700 houses, 850 stores, almost ten mosques, seven churches, ten baths, seven caravanserais, five squares, as well as two bazars and two schools. During the governorship of Hossein Khan Sardar, Erivan's fortifications were reportedly the strongest in the entire country. Its enormous fortress, which was located on "high ground" and was surrounded by thick walls, as well as moats and cannons, helped to prevent the Russian advance for some time. Of the city's two most prominent mosques, one was built in 1687 in the Safavid period, whereas the largest mosque of the city, the Blue Mosque, was built in the 18th century after the establishment of the khanate, and is considered to be a prominent architectural remnant of the era. The palace of the khan was situated nearby one of the mosques.

During Hossein Khan Sardar's governorship, Erivan's population steadily rose. Just before the Russian conquest, its population was approaching 20,000 inhabitants. In contrast, in 1897, some seventy years after the establishment of Russian rule, and with the Armenian resettlements, Erivan only had approximately 14,000 inhabitants.

Demographics
Per article III of the Turkmenchay Treaty, the Iranians had to give the tax records of the lost Caucasus territories to the Russians. However, these records only represented the families that lived in these territories, as well as tax quotas ("būniche"), and thus were not an "accurate count" of the number of people that lived in these provinces, including Iranian Armenia.

The Russians therefore immediately conducted a thorough statistical account of the population of the Erivan Khanate, now renamed to the "Armenian Oblast". Ivan Chopin headed the survey team which gathered the administrative census (Kameral'noe Opisanie''') for the newly established Russian administration in Erivan. Based on the Persian administrative records of the Erivan Khanate as well as interviews, the Kameral'noe Opisanie is considered to be "the only accurate source for any statistical or ethnographical data" on the territories that comprised Iranian Armenia, on the situation before and immediately after the Russian conquest.

Muslims (Persian, Turkic groups and Kurds) formed an absolute majority in Iranian Armenia, comprising some 80% of the population, whereas Christian Armenians formed some 20% of the population. According to the Kameral'noe Opisanie, the settled and semi-settled Muslim population numbered more than 74,000. However, there are flaws regarding this number, as it doesn't account for the settled and semi-settled Muslims that left immediately after the Iranian defeat. For example, basically the entire Persian ruling elite and the military officer apparatus, "most of whom resided in the administrative centers", migrated to mainland Iran after the defeat. Furthermore, a number of the Turkic and Persian soldiers had perished in the 1826–1828 war, which lead to the Russian conquest of the Erivan and Nakchivan Khanates. According to estimations, some 20,000 Muslims had left Iranian Armenia or were killed during the 1826–1828 war. According to professor of history George Bournoutian, it can therefore be taken for granted that the combined Persian and Turkic (settled and semi-settled) population of Iranian Armenia amounted some 93,000, instead of 74,000.

The total Muslim population of Iranian Armenia (incl. semi-settled, nomadic, and settled), prior to the Russian invasion and conquest, amounted "roughly over" 117,000. Some 35,000 of these, were thus not present (i.e. emigration, killed during the war) after the Russians decisively arrived.

After the Russian administration took hold of Iranian Armenia, the ethnic make-up shifted, and thus for the first time in more than four centuries, ethnic Armenians started to form a majority once again in one part of historic Armenia. Some 35,000 Muslims of over 100,000 emigrated from the region, while some 57,000 Armenians from Iran and Turkey (see also; Russo-Turkish War of 1828–1829) arrived after 1828. Due to these new significant demographic shifts, in 1832, the number of Armenians had matched that of the Muslims. Anyhow, it would be only after the Crimean War and the Russo-Turkish War of 1877–1878, which brought another influx of Turkish Armenians, that ethnic Armenians once again established a solid majority in Eastern Armenia. Nevertheless, the city of Erivan remained having a Muslim majority up to the twentieth century. According to the Brockhaus and Efron Encyclopedic Dictionary, published in the final few decades of the Russian Empire, Russians made up 2 %, Armenians 48 % and Aderbeijani Tatars 49 % of the population of Erivan in the 1890s. According to the traveler H. F. B. Lynch, the city of Erivan was about 50% Armenian and 50% Muslim in the early 1890s. H. F. B. Lynch thought that some among the Muslims were Persians when he visited the city within the same decade. Whereas according to modern historians George Bournoutian and Robert H. Hewsen, Lynch thought many were Persian.

Persians

The Persians were the elite in the region, and were part of the settled population. The term "Persians" in this specific matter refers to the ruling hierarchy of the khanate, and does not necessarily denote the ethnic composition of the group. There were thus ethnic "Persians" and "Turks" among the ruling "Persian" elite of the khanate. This ruling elite were primarily the members of the governors' household, his close associates, the officer corps, the members of the local Persian bureaucracy, and some of the prosperous merchants. The Persian ruling elite was a minority among the Muslims in the khanate. During the 1826–1828 war, which lead to the Russian conquest, a number of the Persian ruling elite was killed; the remaining number, basically migrated "in toto" to Iran proper after the Russians decisively gained control of the province.

Turkics

The Turkics were the largest group in the khanate, but they were composed of three branches; settled, semi-settled, and nomadic. Similar to the Persian ruling elite, a number of them had perished in the 1826–1828 war against the Russians. The principal settled Turkic groups in the khanate were the Bayat, Kangarlu, Ayrumlu, Ak Koyunlu, Qara Qoyunlu, Qajars, as well as the "Turkified Qazzaqs" (i.e. Karapapakh). A large number of the Turkic groups, numbering some 35,000, were some sort of nomads. Alike the Kurds, some of the Turkic groups had specific areas where they moved to for summer and winter. The Turkic nomads were important to the local Persian governors for their animal husbandry, handicrafts and horses which they provided for the cavalry. The settled Turkics made up a large percentage of the workers in the agricultural sector. Together with the Kurds, the nomadic Turkic groups used about half the territory of the khanate for their pastoral way of life. There was rivalry between the leading Turkic groups. Due to the nomadic nature of many of the Turkic groups, they were located in many of the districts. They were abundantly presented in the central and northern parts of the khanate, where they "controlled the marginal grazing lands". There was a traditional sense of hostility between the Turkic nomads and the Kurds. The Karapapakh and the Ayrumlu were the largest Turkic nomad groups; most of them were resettled in Azerbaijan (historic Azerbaijan, also known as Iranian Azerbaijan) with the help of Abbas Mirza, after 1828.

Kurds

Regarding the Kurds, the Kameral'noe Opisanie lists more than 10,000 inhabitants (of various tribes), and notes that some 15,000 had migrated after the Russian annexation. The total Kurdish population (pre-war) would therefore amount over 25,000 individuals. The Kurds were nomadic by tradition, similar to a large number of the Turkic groups. Together with the nomadic Turkic groups, the Kurds used about half the territory of the khanate for their pastoral way of life. The Kurds were primarily of three religious affiliations; Sunni, Shia, and Yezidi. There was a traditional sense of hostility between the Kurds and the Turkic nomads.

Armenians

Christians Armenians formed a minority in the khanate, comprising some 20%, and formed no majority in any of the mahals (districts). The utter vast majority of the Armenians, some 80% of their total number, were located in the districts (mahals) of Kirk-Bulagh, Karbi-Basar, Surmalu, and Sardarabad. As with other minorities in Western Asia, they lived close to their "religious and administrative centers". There were also Armenians in the provincial capital of Erivan. There were reportedly no Armenians in the Sharur and Sa'dlu districts and only "very few" in Garni-Basar, Gökcha, Aparan, Talin, Sayyidli-Akhsakhli, and Vedi-Basar.

Many events had led to the demise of the Armenian population from the region. Until the mid-fourteenth century, Armenians had constituted a majority in Eastern Armenia. At the close of the fourteenth century, after Timur's campaigns, Islam had become the dominant faith, and Armenians became a minority in Eastern Armenia.

Shah Abbas I's deportation of much of the population from the Armenian Highlands in 1605 was one later event, when as many as 250,000 Armenians were removed from the region. To repopulate the frontier region of his realm, Shah Abbas II (1642–1666) permitted the Turkic Kangarlu tribe to return. Under Nader Shah (r. 1736-1747), when the Armenians suffered excessive taxation and other penalties, many emigrated, particularly to India.

Even though both Muslims and Armenians practiced the various professions, it were the Armenians who dominated the trade and professions in the khanate. They were thus of major economic significance to the Iranian administration. Though the Armenians sympathised with the Christian Russians, they were indifferent to them as a whole; immediate concerns, both rural and urban Armenians, was limited to socio-economic "well-being". As long as the living conditions in the khanate were considered to be appropriate, the majority of Armenians felt no urge to take any actions. An example of this can be seen in 1808; when the Russians launched another siege in that year, in a 2nd attempt to take the city from the Iranians, the Armenians displayed "general neutrality".

Partial Armenian autonomy

Armenians in the territory of the Khanate lived under the immediate jurisdiction of the melik'' of Erivan, from the House of the Melik-Aghamalyan family, who had the sole right to govern them with the authorization of the shah. The inception of the melikdom of Erivan appears only after the end of the last Ottoman–Safavid War in 1639 and seems to have been a part of an overall administrative reorganization in Iranian Armenia after a long period of wars and invasions. The first known member of the family is a certain Melik Gilan but the first certain holder of the title of "melik of Erivan" was Melik Aghamal and it may be from him that the house had taken its surname. One of his successors, Melik-Hakob-Jan, attended the coronation of Nader Shah in the Mughan plain in 1736.

Under the melik of Erivan were a number of other meliks in the khanate, with each maḥall inhabited by Armenians having its own local melik. The meliks of Erivan themselves, especially the last, Melik Sahak II, were among the most important, influential and respected individuals in the khanate and both Christians and Muslims alike sought their advice, protection and intercession. Second in importance only to the khan himself, they alone among the Armenians of Erivan were allowed to wear the dress of an Iranian of rank. The melik of Erivan had full administrative, legislative and judicial authority over Armenians up to the sentence of the death penalty, which only the khan was allowed to impose. The melik exercised a military function as well, because he or his appointee commanded the Armenian infantry contingents in the khan's army. All the other meliks and village headmen of the khanate were subordinate to the melik of Erivan and all the Armenian villages of the khanate were required to pay him an annual tax.

List of Khans

 1747–48 Mehdi-Khan Qasemlu
 1748–50 Hasan Ali-khan
 1750–80 Hoseyn Ali Khan
 1752–55 Khalil Khan
 1755–62 Hasan Ali Khan Qajar
 1762–83 Hoseyn Ali Khan
 1783–84 Gholam Ali (son of Hasan Ali)
 1784–1805 Mohammad Khan Qajar
 1805–06 Mehdi Qoli Khan Qajar
 1806–07 Ahmad Khan Moqaddam
 1807–28 Hossein Qoli Khan Qajar

In Azerbaijani historiography

From the mid-2000s, the concept of a "Western Azerbaijan", originally a colloquialism used by some Azerbaijani refugees to refer to the Armenian SSR of the Soviet Union, was merged into renewed interest of the Khanates of the Caucasus, in, what the historian and political scientist Laurence Broers explains as "wide-ranging fetishisation" of the Erivan Khanate as a "historically Azerbaijani entity".

Azerbaijani historiography regards the Erivan Khanate as an "Azerbaijani state" which was populated by autochthonous Azerbaijani Turks, and its soil is sacralised, as Broers adds, "as the burial ground of semi-mythological figures from the Turkic pantheon". In the process of employing historical negationism, it has undergone the same type of transformation within Azerbaijani historiography like the historic entity of Caucasian Albania before it. Within Azerbaijani historiography, the terms "Azerbaijani Turk" and "Muslim" are used interchangeably when dealing with the Erivan Khanate, even though contemporary demographic surveys differentiate "Muslims" into Persians, Shia and Sunni Kurds and Turkic tribes. 

Broers regards this phenomenon in Azerbaijan as being part of a "Wide Azerbaijanism", a geopolitical confection emerging "at the meeting point of two previously subdued geographies made relevant by both sovereignty and the Armenian-Azerbaijan conflict" over Nagorno-Karabakh.

According to Broers, catalogues of "lost Azerbaijani heritage" portray an array of "Turkic palimpsest beneath almost every monument and religious site in Armenia – whether Christian or Muslim". Additionally, from around 2007, standard maps of Azerbaijan started to show Turkic toponyms printed in red underneath the Armenian ones on the major part of Armenia which it shows. In terms of rhetoric, as Broers narrates, the Azerbaijani palimpsest beneath Armenia "reaches into the future as a prospective territorial claim". The Armenian capital of Yerevan is particularly focused by this narrative; the Erivan Fortress and Sardar Palace, which had been demolished by the Soviets during their building of the city, have become "widely disseminated symbols of lost Azerbaijani heritage recalling the fetishised contours of a severed body part".

See also
 Mirza Kadym Irevani
 Sardar Iravani
 Treaty of Turkmenchay
 Iranian Armenia (1502–1828)
 Islam in Armenia
 Islam in Azerbaijan

Notes

References

Sources
 
 
 
 
 
 
 
  
 

 
History of Iğdır Province
History of Kars Province